Tursunkhon Solieva (1922-2001) was an artist of the Osh State Academic Uzbek Music and Drama Theater named after Bobur, People's Artist of Kyrgyzstan, made a great contribution to the development of culture and art in Kyrgyzstan.

Biography 
Tursunkhon Solieva was born on December 17, 1922 in the city of Osh. For more than half a century, she worked at the Osh Uzbek Music and Drama Theater named after Babur, where she played more than 150 roles in performances in various genres. In 1940-1944 she worked at the Mukimi Theater in the city of Tashkent, and since 1944 she returned to work on the stage of the Osh Uzbek Drama Theater.

For her contribution to the development of theatrical art, the rapprochement of Uzbek and Kyrgyz cultures in 1953, Tursunkhon Solieva was awarded the title of Honored Artist of the Kyrgyz SSR, and in 1974, People's Artist of Kyrgyzstan. 

She died on September 21, 2001 in the city of Osh.

In 2017, the Union of Theater Workers of Kyrgyzstan established the Tursunkhon Solieva Prize.

Literature 
 
 
  ББК 92я.
 
  
 
  Мат-лы к декаде кирг. искусства в Москве. 1939 г.
 
 
 
 
  21 см, ББК 85.4. 
  − 76 с.: ил.; 16 см.
  
  УДК 351/354.

1922 births
Uzbeks
2001 deaths
Kyrgyzstani actresses

 Soviet actresses
Communist Party of the Soviet Union members